Roberto Saad (born 3 June 1961) is a former professional tennis player from Argentina.

Saad enjoyed most of his tennis success while playing doubles. During his career, he won two doubles titles. He achieved a career-high doubles ranking of World No. 36 in 1988.

Saad is of Lebanese descent

Career finals

Doubles (2 wins – 2 losses)

References

External links
 
 

Argentine male tennis players
Argentine people of Lebanese descent
Sportspeople of Lebanese descent
Sportspeople from Tucumán Province
Living people
1961 births
Tennis players at the 1979 Pan American Games
Pan American Games competitors for Argentina